This is a chronological list of notable classical Portuguese composers.

Middle Ages 
King Dinis I, King of Portugal, composer and troubadour. He composed more than 200 cantigas.

Renaissance 
Pedro de Escobar (c. 1465–after 1535), composer and flutist
Cosme Delgado (c. 1530–1596), composer of polyphony, kapellmeister in Évora and pedagogue
Vicente Lusitano (d. after 1561), composer and music theorist
Bartolomeo Trosylho (1500–1567), composer and kapellmeister in the Lisbon Cathedral
Damião de Góis (1502–1574), humanist philosopher, composer, student of Erasmus, secretary at a trading post in Antwerp
António Carreira (1520–1597), composer and organist
Diogo Dias Melgás (1538–1600), composer of polyphony
Pedro de Cristo (1545–1618), composer of polyphony
Manuel Mendes (1547–1605), composer and maestro
Heliodoro de Paiva (fl. 1552), composer, philosopher and theologian
Manuel Rodrigues Coelho (1555–1635), composer and organist of the late Renaissance and early Baroque
Duarte Lobo (1565–1646), composer, choirmaster and musical director
Manuel Cardoso (1566–1650), composer and organist
Gaspar Fernandes (1566–1629), composer and organist
Estêvão de Brito (1570–1641), composer of polyphony of the late Renaissance and early Baroque
Filipe de Magalhães (1571–1652), composer of sacred polyphony and teacher of Estêvão Lopes Morago, Estêvão de Brito and Manuel Correia
Manuel Machado (1590–1646), composer and harpist

Baroque 
Manuel Correia (1600–1653), composer and kapellmeister at the La Seo Cathedral
King John IV (1603–1656), King of Portugal and early musicologist, with an essay on Giovanni Pierluigi da Palestrina
João Lourenço Rebelo(1610–1665), composer close to John IV
Filipe da Madre de Deus (1633–1688), composer and kapellmeister of the royal music chamber
King Peter II (1648–1706), King of Portugal and composer (only ten organ pieces)
João Rodrigues Esteves, (1700–1751) composer of religious music
Carlos Seixas (1704–1742), composer and organist
António Teixeira (1707 – after 1769), composer and chief of the choir of Lisbon Cathedral
Frei Jacinto do Sacramento (1712–1780?), harpsichordist, organist and composer in Lisbon
Alberto Joseph Gomes da Silva (v.1713-1795), composer and organist
Francisco António de Almeida (before 1722 – c.1755), composer and organist
João de Sousa Carvalho (1745–1798), composer and harpsichordist
José Joaquim dos Santos (? 1747–1801), graduate of Royal Patriarchal Music Seminary, teacher, composer, singer, organist and conductor (famous for his religious music: Stabat Mater for three voices, 2 sopranos, bass, with 2 violins and violoncello and the 5 Misereres).

Classical period 
Pedro António Avondano (1714–1782), composer and organist (the first Portuguese composer of the Classical period)
João Pedro de Almeida Mota (1744–1817), Portuguese composer, worked in Spain for many years, where he died. His works are scattered by these two countries.
João José Baldi (1770–1816), composer (famous for his operas) and pianist
João Domingos Bomtempo (1775–1842), pianist, composer and pedagogue
Marcos Portugal (1762–1830), composer (famous for his operas) and maestro at Teatro S. Carlos in Lisbon
Peter IV of Portugal (1798–1836), King of Portugal and Emperor of Brazil who was also a composer (pupil of Marcos Portugal and Nunes Garcia, as well as Sigismund Von Neucomm, a pupil of Haydn).

Romanticism – early 20th century 
Manuel Inocêncio Liberato dos Santos (1805–1887), composer and pianist
Francisco de Sá Noronha (1820–1881), composer and violinist
José Augusto Ferreira Veiga, Viscount of Arneiro, (1838–1903) composer and ballet choreographer
Alfredo Keil (1850–1907), composer of operas and author of the music of the Portuguese national anthem
José Vianna da Motta (1868–1948), pianist, teacher and composer
Luís de Freitas Branco (1890–1955), composer and academic
António Fragoso (1897–1918), pianist and composer
Eurico Thomaz de Lima (1908–1989), composer, pianist and pedagogue

Contemporary 

Álvaro Salazar (1938–), composer, songwriter and conductor
António Chagas Rosa (1960–), contemporary composer
António Pinho Vargas (1951–), jazz and contemporary music pianist and composer
António Victorino de Almeida (1940–), contemporary music composer
Bruno Bizarro (1979–), film composer, composer, songwriter
Constança Capdeville (1937–1992), contemporary music composer and teacher
Emmanuel Nunes (1941–2012), contemporary music composer
Eurico Carrapatoso (1962–), composer of mostly orchestral, chamber, choral, and vocal works
Fernando Corrêa de Oliveira (1921–2004), composer
Fernando Lopes Graça (1906–1994), composer and musicologist
Isabel Soveral (1961–), contemporary composer
Jaime Reis (1983–), contemporary composer
Joly Braga Santos (1924–1988), contemporary composer and conductor
Jorge Peixinho (1940–1995), contemporary music composer and teacher
Luís Tinoco (1969–), contemporary music composer
Pedro Macedo Camacho (1979–), concert music composer, videogame and film composer
Rodrigo Leão (1964–), contemporary composer, instrumental music composer, film composer

References 

VASCONCELOS, André. Música em Portugal, Porto Editora.
Dicionário de História de Portugal, editado por Joel Serrão
Grande Enciclopédia Portuguesa-Brasileira ed. de 1945

List
Portuguese
Composers